Alternative Chartbusters is a live album by the band Stiff Little Fingers, released in 1991 (see 1991 in music). The album was recorded live at Brixton Academy on October 1, 1988.

Track listing
"Suspect Device" (Stiff Little Fingers, Ogilvie)
"Alternative Ulster" (Stiff Little Fingers, Ogilvie)
"Gotta Gettaway" (Stiff Little Fingers, Ogilvie)
"At the Edge" (Stiff Little Fingers)
"Nobody's Heroes" (Stiff Little Fingers)
"Tin Soldiers" (Stiff Little Fingers, Ogilvie)
"Just Fade Away" (Stiff Little Fingers, Ogilvie)
"Silver Lining" (Stiff Little Fingers, Ogilvie)
"Johnny Was" (Bob Marley)
"The Last Time"
"Mr. Fire Coal Man"
"Two Guitars Clash" (Cluney)

Personnel
Stiff Little Fingers
Jake Burns – vocals, guitar
Dolphin Taylor – drums
Henry Cluney – guitar
Ali McMordie – bass

References

1989 compilation albums
Stiff Little Fingers compilation albums
Albums recorded at the Brixton Academy